Leo is a 2000 Spanish drama film, written and directed by José Luis Borau and starring Icíar Bollaín and Javier Batanero. It was nominated for six Goya Awards in 2001, and won the award for Best Director.

Cast

Release 
Leo entered into the 22nd Moscow International Film Festival. It was released theatrically in Spain on 1 September 2000.

Reception 
Jonathan Holland of Variety gave a mixed review to Leo, assessing that "the strangely untidy script" is kept from sinking by "superb perfs", "a thought-provoking central idea and gold-plated professionalism".

Accolades 

|-
| rowspan = "6" align = "center" | 2001 || rowspan = "6" | 15th Goya Awards || colspan = "2" | Best Film ||  || rowspan = "6" | 
|-
| Best Director || José Luis Borau || 
|-
| Best Original Screenplay || José Luis Borau || 
|-
| Best Actress || Iciar Bollaín || 
|-
| Best Editing || José Salcedo || 
|-
| Best New Actor || Javier Batanero || 
|}

See also 
 List of Spanish films of 2000

References

External links
 

2000 films
2000 drama films
Spanish drama films
2000s Spanish-language films
2000s Spanish films